Joschua Neuenschwander (born 28 June 2000) is a Swiss professional football player who plays for Aarau.

Club career 
Joschua Neuenschwander made his professional debut for BSC Young Boys on the 21 May 2021, replacing Guillaume Faivre during the 4-2 away Super League win against FC Lausanne-Sport. By not letting Lausanne score any other goal after he came in at the 66th minute, he allowed his team to beat the Swiss league record for the fewest goals conceded in a season (only 29), previously held by FC Basel (who had 31 goal against in 2012–13).

On 14 July 2022, Neuenschwander signed with Aarau.

References

External links
 

2000 births
People from Bern-Mittelland District
Sportspeople from the canton of Bern
Living people
Swiss men's footballers
Switzerland youth international footballers
Association football goalkeepers
BSC Young Boys players
FC Köniz players
SC Kriens players
FC Aarau players
Swiss 1. Liga (football) players
Swiss Promotion League players
Swiss Super League players
Swiss Challenge League players